Opetiopalpus is a genus of beetles belonging to the family Cleridae.

Species:
 Opetiopalpus scutellaris (Panzer, 1797)

References

Cleridae